The Adirondack Guideboat is a rowboat that was developed in the 1840s for recreational activities in Adirondack Park. It was designed to have a shallow draft, carry three people and their gear, and be light enough to be portaged by one man, the guide. Typical dimensions are 16 feet long, with a 38 inch beam, and weighing 60 pounds. While superficially resembling a canoe in size and profile, its construction methods are very different and are one of its defining features.

The stem and ribs are made from spruce, a wood which has a very good strength to weight ratio. The hull is planked up with cedar laps, with seams tacked with copper tacks. The hull has a bottom board, like a dory, typically made of pine. Ribs are traditionally cut from spruce roots which have a grain following the desired curvature of the rib.

Since 1962 the annual Willard Hanmer Guideboat Race has been held on the closest Sunday to the 4th of July in Saranac Lake. It is a 10-mile canoe and kayak race on Lake Flower and down the Saranac River. 

Modern hand-crafted versions can sell for about 20,000 US dollars.

References

Gallery

Further reading
  
  

Adirondacks
Rowing boats